CU (Korean: 씨유) is a South Korean convenience store chain that is operated and owned by BGF Retail. It was formed after FamilyMart's franchise license in South Korea expired.

Development 

Bogwang FamilyMart changed its name to BGF Retail in 2012 to launch its own convenience store brand, CU. The motive of this move was to establish a Korean style convenience store for the customers. CU stands for "CVS for U," and also resembles the English SMS abbrevation for "see you". Since 1990, FamilyMart had been dominating the South Korean convenience store market for 22 years. Bogwang Group and FamilyMart signed a contract that effectively barred the latter from all of Korea between 2014 and 2016.  However, after FamilyMart's exit in 2014, the brand has not yet relaunched in the Korean peninsula. In April 2019, CU has started a delivery service, and magnified the service to 1000 stores in May.

Relationship with FamilyMart 

In 1990, FamilyMart officially launched their first store in South Korea, entering the market. The Bogwang FamilyMart Corporation had to give FamilyMart brand a royalty which meant that technically most of the money that FamilyMart made in South Korea was going to Japan.

In 2012, the CU brand was launched, and over about two years BGF Retail changed the store signs from FamilyMart to CU. However, some store managers refused to change the store sign because they did not want to "restart" with a barely known brand and wanted to keep the FamilyMart sign. However, BGF Retail ended up changing all the signs forcefully, but later added "with FamilyMart" on the sign to get rid of customer confusion. However, CU stores made less profit because many people were not used to the brand. They started making profit, and by 2016 CU was as popular as FamilyMart.

Currently, FamilyMart has no control over CU. The "with FamilyMart" stickers that were on the store signs were taken off, and FamilyMart has completely disappeared from the South Korean market. However, during AFC (Asian Football Confederation) soccer matches, FamilyMart is still advertised even if the match is in South Korea. This is because FamilyMart is a partner of the AFC, and has nothing to do with the former Korean version of Bogwang FamilyMart.

Foreign operations

Iran 
CU launched its first foreign store in November 2018, in Tehran, Iran. However, the store had not even operated for a month when it had to close because of the United States' sanctions against Iran.

Mongolia 
CU has opened 304 stores in Ulaanbaatar, 1 store in Darkhan-Uul, Mongolia as of Dec, 2022. Also, they planned to expand the number of branches from 200 to 240 by the end of the 2022. CU competes with another Korean convenience chain, GS25, which has  124 stores throughout the capital region.

Malaysia 

CU opened its first stores within Malaysia in 2021, after reaching a partnership with local convenience store company myNews Holdings Bhd. CU plans to open 500 stores within Malaysia by 2026; the group will initially open 30 to 50 CU stores and assess their sales performance before expanding further. In April 2021, CU opened its first store in Centerpoint Bandar Utama.

Former logos of CU 
CU has changed its logo several times in the past.

References

External links 

 BGF Retails and CU
(in Korean) CU opens 9000th store in South Korea
(in Mongolian) CU Mongolia official page
CU opens first overseas store in Iran

Companies based in Seoul
South Korean brands
Retail companies of South Korea
Convenience stores
Retail companies established in 1990
South Korean companies established in 1990